Miyagegashi, also , refers to a sweet made with the purpose of selling it as a souvenir. As with most other Japanese souvenirs (omiyage), the typical miyagegashi is a regional specialty (meibutsu) and cannot be bought outside its specific geographic area. The making and selling of omiyagegashi is an important part of Japan's omiyage (souvenir) industry.

List of miyagegashi

 Available everywhere
 Japanese cheesecake

 Fukuoka  
 Hakata no Hito, rolled pastry containing red bean paste
 Hakata torimon (:ja:博多通りもん)
 Hiyoko (:ja:ひよ子) 

 Fukushima
 Awa manju
 Mamador

 Hiroshima
 Momiji manjū

 Hokkaido
 Shiroi Koibito
 Royce'

  Hyōgo
 , a sponge cake made of sugar, flour, eggs, and starch syrup. Castella was brought to Japan by Portuguese merchants in the 16th century. The name is derived from Portuguese Pão de Castela, meaning "bread from Castile". Castella cake is usually sold in long boxes, with the cake inside being approximately 27 cm long.
 Fugetsudo
 Shiome manju - Akō

 Kumamoto
Ikinari dango

 Kyoto
, one of the region's best known meibutsu. It is made from glutinous , sugar and cinnamon. Baked, it is similar to senbei.

 Nagoya
 Uirō

 Okinawa
, a traditional small biscuit made of mostly lard and flour, with a mild and sweet flavor very similar to shortbread.
, a variety of citrus peeled and reduced in sugar for up to several days, then dusted with toppings

 Tokyo
The individually wrapped steamed sponge cake filled with a sweet banana custard went on sale in 1991 and is massively popular.

See also
 List of Japanese desserts and sweets
 Meibutsu
 Tokusanhin
 Wagashi

References

Japanese desserts and sweets
Tourism in Japan